Root Lake station is a station in Manitoba, Canada, located between Root Lake and Clearwater Lake Provincial Park along  Manitoba Highway 10.  The station is served by Via Rail's The Pas-Pukatawagan line for the Keewatin Railway twice per week in each direction.

References 

Via Rail stations in Manitoba